Acrolophus sinclairi is a moth of the family Acrolophidae. It is found in North America, including California, New Mexico and Texas.

References

Moths described in 1964
sinclairi